Susan Fiona Bailey,  ( Gilroy; born 19 October 1972) is a British para table tennis player and primary school teacher. She has competed in six Paralympic Games (2000, 2004, 2008, 2012, 2016 and 2020) and at the Commonwealth Games (2002 and 2006).

Bailey began playing table tennis at the age of 12 but her Ehlers–Danlos syndrome (EDS) made her stop at 15; she also has fibromyalgia and chronic pain syndrome. She started playing again at the age of 18 in a wheelchair.

Competing for England she won a gold medal in singles at the 2002 Commonwealth Games in Manchester and successfully defended her title in Melbourne in 2006.

Honours
In 2009, Bailey was awarded an honorary doctorate by Sheffield Hallam University. In the 2009 Queen's Birthday Honours, she was appointed a Member of the Order of the British Empire (MBE) "for services to Disabled and Able-Bodied Table Tennis and to Sport for Young People.".

References

1972 births
Living people
People with Ehlers–Danlos syndrome
English female table tennis players
Paralympic table tennis players of Great Britain
Table tennis players at the 2000 Summer Paralympics
Table tennis players at the 2004 Summer Paralympics
Table tennis players at the 2008 Summer Paralympics
Table tennis players at the 2012 Summer Paralympics
Table tennis players at the 2016 Summer Paralympics
Table tennis players at the 2020 Summer Paralympics
Members of the Order of the British Empire
Sportspeople from Barnsley
Commonwealth Games medallists in table tennis
Commonwealth Games gold medallists for England
Table tennis players at the 2002 Commonwealth Games
Table tennis players at the 2006 Commonwealth Games
Medallists at the 2002 Commonwealth Games
Medallists at the 2006 Commonwealth Games